Raymundo Escalante (born 12 January 1964) is a Mexican sprinter. He competed in the men's 4 × 100 metres relay at the 1992 Summer Olympics.

References

1964 births
Living people
Athletes (track and field) at the 1992 Summer Olympics
Athletes (track and field) at the 1995 Pan American Games
Mexican male sprinters
Olympic athletes of Mexico
Place of birth missing (living people)
Pan American Games competitors for Mexico
20th-century Mexican people